Thomas Weston (2 August 1890 – 1952) was a footballer who played in the Football League for Aston Villa and Stoke.

Career
Weston was born in Halesowen and played for several amateur sides before joining Aston Villa in 1911. He soon established himself as first choice full back and earned a reputation as a tough and uncompromising defender. He helped Villa win the FA Cup in 1912–13 and 1919–20. He made 178 appearances for the "Villans" in the seven seasons he spent at Villa Park, helping them finish runners-up in the First Division twice in 1912–13 and 1913–14. He left in the summer of 1922 and joined newly promoted Stoke where he only managed to play four matches in 1922–23 before deciding to retire.

Career statistics

Honours
 Aston Villa
 FA Cup winner: 1912–13, 1919–20

References

1890 births
1952 deaths
People from Halesowen
English footballers
Association football fullbacks
Coombs Wood F.C. players
Stourbridge F.C. players
Aston Villa F.C. players
Stoke City F.C. players
English Football League players
FA Cup Final players